Manitoba Blue Cross is a not-for-profit health benefits provider headquartered in Winnipeg, Manitoba.

History
Affiliated with the Canadian Association of Blue Cross Plans, Manitoba Blue Cross was founded in 1974. Its history, however, dates back to the 1938 when the Manitoba Hospital Services Association (a non-profit, hospital-sponsored association and the first organization to operate as Manitoba Blue Cross) began offering hospital benefits on a prepaid basis.

Present
Manitoba Blue Cross, with its subsidiary Blue Cross Life, provides health, dental, employee assistance, life, disability and travel coverage for over half a million Manitobans. In 2018, it was named a 2018 Manitoba Top Employer by MediaCorp Canada.

Community initiatives
Manitoba Blue Cross is the primary contributor of funding and administrative support for the Manitoba Medical Services Foundation (MMSF), a foundation which supports scientific research that advances and maintains the health and welfare of Manitoba residents.

Manitoba Blue Cross also supports the Children's Wish Foundation, providing free travel coverage to Manitoba children and their families any time a travel wish is granted.

References

External links
 Manitoba Blue Cross website

Financial services companies established in 1974
Health insurance companies of Canada
1974 establishments in Manitoba
Companies based in Winnipeg
Financial services companies based in Manitoba